Hair Peace Salon is a power pop band from Minsk, Belarus, influenced by British indie rock. Hair Peace Salon's music is distinguished by its use of English lyrics with emotional flow and drastic mood swings in songs. The group was founded in 1998, and they have released one full-length album Gentleman, and numerous singles and EPs. In 2013, the members took a break when frontman and co-founder Aleh Vial created another band, Bristeil.

History

Early years (1998–2001)
Aleh Vial wanted to play music in 1996, but waited until the next year when his brother bought him a drum kit. In 1998 he gathered two schoolmates, Maxim Devichensky and Alex Vashchilo, for his band, which became the foundation for Hair Peace Salon. They were inspired by local bands and bands such as Nirvana. The first years of the band were spent learning how to play together and experimenting with new ideas and methods of songwriting.

First releases (2002–2006)
Their first public performance was given on 22 February 2002 at The Base club in Minsk. The show was dedicated to the birthday of Kurt Cobain, and the band played a couple of their songs.

In the same year, their original drummer Alex Vashchilo left the band, and Artur Luchkov replaced him. By 2003, the band became a classically structured rock quartet (rhythm guitar, lead guitar, bass guitar, and drums) with lead guitarist Vadim Dubina.

In June 2004 Hair Peace Salon, together with the Jitters band, played at the international festival “Piirideta Muusika”, which took place in Narva, (Estonia). At the same time, Aleh Vial (guitar, vocal) and Artur Luchkov (drums) were playing in another indie and alternative rock band Jitters, which was being headed by its frontman Konstantin Karman on lead vocals and bass. In general, players from both bands were performing at the same concerts, often producing similar music in the British wave style, so their members knew each other well and were friends. The band was taking steps onto the grunge music scene, actively playing on the Nirvana influenced gigs during the second part of 2004.

Their lead guitarist Vadim Dubina left the group due to family circumstances in 2005. There were a few months without a lead guitar player. However, eventually, at the end of searching and experiments, Hair Peace Salon found Vadim Isaev from Zhodzina, the familiarity of whom came to fruition via the newspaper "Muzykal'naya Gazeta". They hit the road to successfully play at the Basovišča'05 festival in Poland in July, and at the musicfest "Rock-kola-2005" (Polotsk) in December.

Their next CD was released in 2005. It contained the full EP "Hover" with the self-titled lead single, which was taken to be presented on the music compilation "Spotlight On" of various alternative rock artists, which was released on the label Matchbox Recordings on 14 November 2005. In October, the frontman Aleh Vial stopped cooperation with the amicable Jitters band, where he played guitar and was a backing vocalist in parallel, because of specific technical and logical reasons, and to devote more time to his band.

At the end of spring 2006, drummer Artur Luchkov became exempt from the side duties in Jitters too, and the quintet spent that year performing on stage, in addition to concerts across Belarus, and some abroad festivals such as the Polish "Rock bez Igły" (Tychy), "Wioslo Jacwinga" (Suwałki), and "Fiesta Borealis" (Olecko). Also, the musicians showed up at the concert in support of the series of self-titled compilation albums “Songs of Freedom” led by Neuro Dubel, N.R.M., and some other prominent Belarusian rock bands, which was held at the Bangalor square in Minsk on 25 August 2006.

Gipsy and in Tune (2007–2009) 
In 2007 the second EP was released. All songs were performed by all four official band members, while keyboard parts were played by a few different session musicians. The band got the nominee in the category "Rush of the year" at the "Рок-коронация 2007" award show in February, won a selection into the finale in May as the finalist of the contest “ИдиНаРок” in June with its prize, got to record a song in a professional music studio, performed at the biggest country stages during the Day of the City Minsk and at the festival "Ambasovišča" was held by the Belarusian Embassy of the US in September, and became just a semi-finalist on the international live music competition Global Battle of the Bands (2007), but lost to a French band Milque Twins.

After tinkering with sessional keyboardists prior to and on the “Acoustics of Spring” March presentation in view of a half of the year business trip of Konstantin Karman, to the end of 2007 the number of the official members of the band was increased, as he paused the existence of his band Jitters and was invited to play in Hair Peace Salon on a full-time basis. The band already had a full-time bass player, and because he had bought a Roland JP-8000 on his business trip to Scotland, he became a keyboardist with vocal parts, as well as composing songs. On 28 October 2007 the EP Gipsy was released. The new look of the band was shown at the presentation of the EP Gipsy supported by Open Space and some other musicians and friends of the band on 18 November 2007.

On 25 October 2007 the split album named Split Before, Together Now was released on the West Records label to promote this new collaboration. This CD contained Hair Peace Salon (Gypsy) and Jitters (Pick Me Up) EPs with the original artwork filled with two laced together shoes as a symbol that there were two bands, but since this release they are united now. “The guys from HPS have always admired the creativity of the not very famous but beloved in certain circles Jitters band. And today they caught up them in skill, came near, and even outstripped them in some ways,” highlighted Elena Sobolevskaya from the newspaper Muzykalnaya Gazeta the music standards of both Britpop and brit rock collectives in her album review. In addition to regular gigs, given circa 30 live shows in the 2007 year, musicians were successfully participating in various music contests, such as "Musical Playoffs" (semi-finalists), "Golden Acoustics" (the winners),

The official video on the self-titled lead single of the EP "Hover" featuring new band member Konstantin Karman was filmed in February 2008 to be showcased on the television program «Pro движение+».

In March 2008 the lead guitarist Vadim Isaev left the band. That was a hit during the record sessions of the upcoming EP, and although the band tried to find a new solo guitarist, these efforts fell short. Despite this, the remained quartet decided neither to slow their recording tempo, nor to decrease the number of live performances. They took the second place in the contest "Музыкальный спарринг". The very first presentation of the EP In Tune was held in the "Bronx" club on its release date on 1 November 2008 supported by the folk band Akana-NHS with Irena Kotvitskaya and Rusya from Indiga. This CD had four songs, including one bonus track.

As a winner of preliminary rounds together with the Open Space, in January 2009 the band played on the local final of the Bandscan festival, the final of which had to be taken place in Sweden, but they took the second place after The Toobes. The official video on the single "In Tune" was shot in February, and the full edited clip went on public in December. During the springtime, drummer Artur Luchkov left the band as a result of disagreements within Hair Peace Salon, but after brief searching Alexey Kuznetsov, ex-member of Prophetic Dream, Iris7, and some other bands, was seated in the drum chair.

During the upcoming year, Hair Peace Salon was working in the studio on new material, getting experience with acoustic as well as rock programs, and often playing gigs with the  British wave band Open Space like in previous years.

As a participant in the project "Tuzin. Perazagruzka" from the web-portal "Tuzin.fm" and the public campaign "Budzma Belarusians!", the band re-released its song "Ice Age" in the Belarusian language with the poetically translated lyrics by man of letters, Vital Voranau, which became their first song in their native language. This notable track called “Studzień” was put on the compilation CD of the project released in December 2009, subsequently officially digitally re-released on SoundCloud in 2014. In August the band won a national selection organized by European Radio for Belarus and went to Chernihiv (Ukraine) at the "Be Free" festival to present this mother language version of the song live with Lyapis Trubetskoy, Vopli Vidopliassova, and more Belarusian and Ukrainian rock bands.

At the end of the 2009 the band redesigned their website with artwork by Polina Pastushenko, director of the "In Tune" music video, to support the release of the brand new video clip on the song "Like A Whale" filmed as a participant of the TV-show "PROдвижение +". Shortly after, Alexey Kuznetsov left the band in December 2009. The frontman Aleh Vial later said that this happened because they had not been playing with him in harmony well. In the coming months, Vladimir Agayan, fan of the band who won the new drummer selection, became his successor.

Gentleman (2010–2012)

The band was doing well in the first several months of 2010 winning round-by-round in the “Graffiti Open Music Fest” festival, when on 5 April 2010 the very first single of the upcoming full-length album called Happy for a While was released on the Chinese market with different artwork at first to support the signing of the new drummer, while its worldwide release was 5 days later. That one marked the musical shift of the band towards power pop, while the album had to be released next fall. A new melodic and dress code switch was showcased on 10 April 2010, and the release event in the "Broadway" club was supported by Drum Ecstasy, Кассиопея, The Stampletons, and more.

In September 2010 the band made a double release as the brand new rock 'n' roll internet-single Rolz'n'Rulz was supported by the experimental remix EP HPS Remixed filled with 6 remixes of the songs from two latest singles from a few different Minsk electronic stage DJs in trance, drum 'n' bass, downtempo, and more styles.

All of two songs from the singles Happy for a While ("Happy for a While",“Out of Time") and self-titled "Rolz'n'Rulz" were credited with Alexey Kuznetsov as the drummer despite his leaving Hair Peace Salon almost a year ago. On 3 December 2010 the band gave an online concert on the biggest Belarusian web-portal Tut.By, performed several songs from these new singles.

In the press release in support of both single and EP, the band indicated that the work on the upcoming debut album will be done by the start of winter 2010. Nevertheless, during the 2011 year the band continued to be focused on writing songs for the forthcoming album.

On 18 March 2012 the band made the official reveal of the first full-length album in a short video clip. Music works from the past three years were merged in the album Gentleman, and this release was started rolling out for free from the official band's website hairpeacesalon.com from 21 March 2012. It's worth to note that despite the previous announce, only 10 tracks appeared in the final release.

“10 good-quality tracks and nothing redundant ” from “the album we can certainly be proud of” via Tuzin.fm received mostly positive response: “beautiful voice, good lyrics, excellent sound, flawless execution, competent flow”, “"Rolz'n'Rulz" rules”, “this collective is just about closer to the standard of the European tradition of combining rock instruments with enough pop melody than all", "melodic and melancholic songs, beautiful guitars, and the recognizable high vocals of Aleh Vial", "the charm of HPS is not just in stylistic restraint and impeccably qualitative arrangements and compositional work, but also in unconditional organicness", "polyphony that sometimes forces to recall the Fab Four gives lightness and a feeling of a large stroke to sound".

At the same time reviewers noted a lack of brightness and originality, because the record was being heard like an ordinary British wave album. “Very nice work where individuality is felt” as it was noted in the review of the year by Tuzin.fm was selected in a few tops of Belarusian albums released in that span, and its first track "Borderline" was chosen in the top of the best contemporary Belarusian songs by Lenta.ru.

Following the album launch, a substitution was made in the band which played live as a trio for a short time again, as Alex Stepanovich was found to replace Vladimir Agayan, who left Hair Peace Salon in July, and the new drummer was officially introduced in September 2012. Because of that, the release party show was postponed to 11 October 2012.

Break-up (2013) 
Supported the new album with a row of shows, acoustic and full rock ones, for half of a year, at its third appearance at an annual Acoustic of Spring event in March 2013, the band showed some new songs to be released under new Aleh Vial's Bristeil band copyright later on: a brand new song in Belarusian Nieba Abraz and Lana Del Rey's hit Video Games (both are from the Cyruĺnia Svietu EP, the latest one will be actually re-sung and covered in the Belarusian language).

The band received a nomination for "Debut of the Year" at the Rock Profi awards for Gentleman. At the end of August 2013, together with The Toobes and Dzieciuki the band was selected to represent Belarus in Poland at the “Cieszanów Rock Festiwal 2013”.

Having worked together on recording “VS ½ HPS” in Spring 2013, frontman and guitarist Aleh Vial and drummer Alex Stepanovich with two other musicians founded new Belarusian rock band named Bristol later in autumn. The band got a new name Bristeil some time later and in February 2014, the official site was shut down, and subsequently the domain hairpeacesalon.com was merged with bristeil.com  The band has never declared about its break-up, but since 2013 there were no new songs released.

Style 
Musicians of Hair Peace Salon started as an alternative rock band at the turn of the millennium, through the first decade of 2000 with an indie rock. brit rock, and Britpop repertoire, became known in the 2010s mainly as performers of English power pop. The music of the band gives emotions of sadness and empathy, so their work more closely matches the definition of brit rock, in which a depressive mood is often present.

Volha Samusik, contributor for the “Muzykalnaya Gazeta”, told about the band's performance at the Basovišča'2005 festival on the pages of the periodical, stating: There is a noticeable claim on the Westernism of the sound. The guys play just like crazy. Basovišča is not their level. We do not understand, why they spend their musical time here, they need to conquer European heights... Hair Peace Salon is a good band, especially for those who are a true brit-pop-rocker”.

In a review of the 2005 year EP "Hover", the “Muzykalnaya Gazeta” described the music of Hair Peace Salon as “guitar rock in English, rich in ideas, spectacular, which sends you to prog music (what the hell, it is as if brit rockers got complicated)... great vocals. As it is «approved» for this kind of music, arrangeable emotions are poor.” In general, the sound of the group is entirely compared to the music of Jitters; after listening to promotional discs for the 2005 year of both bands, О’К put this notion on paper in the same issue of the newspaper, “everything that is written about HPS can be written about Jitters. Maybe “The Jitters” are a little sharper. A half of the members of Jitters completely plays in Hair Peace Salon... or vice versa”.

Colleagues of musicians from the Caravan band, when they were asked a question by the newspaper “Muzykalnaya Gazeta” about collectives that they like, in the second January issue of 2005 chose “excellent collectives” Hair Peace Salon and Jitters, because “they play original music”.

After one of their concerts around the time of September 2006, columnist for the “Muzykalnaya Gazeta” Slap highly praised the band, “There was an impression that this music is already crowded in a small club room. Taking into account the incandescence of emotions, the quality of material, and its play, it was obvious that it is time to go onto big stages and to a large audience for the guys”.

Konstantin Karman joined the band in 2007, playing the synthesizer. Following the results of listening to the album Split Before, Together Now, the “Muzykalnaya Gazeta” once again definitely attributed the creativity of “the Minsk blood brothers of Coldplay” to the British rock scene, because “the bands which belong to britpop (Travis, Radiohead, Muse, Blur, Coldplay) have much in common, they are known, therefore they can be attributed to something... "salons" have something in the sound that is close to all of these collectives, with their own characteristics, of course, but it is known in the same way”.

Tat'yana Zamirovskaya from the weekly “BelGazeta” described Hair Peace Salon's music in the review of the same album with the following words, “brit rock with dizzy harmonies' weaves à la The Mars Volta, technical guitar arpeggios à la Muse, and neurotic-sensual intonations à la Travis... some HPS tunes inexplicably reminiscent the new album of Radiohead (released after the disc material has been recorded!)”. Another Radiohead comparison was made by her via BelaPAN in 2009.

Elena Sobolevskaya from the music newspaper “Muzykalnaya Gazeta” wrote in 2007, “it has been known for a long time that Hair Peace Salon is not music for the masses”.

Language issue
During their early years of existence, Hair Peace Salon performed in English and thus were not invited to festivals and on-air rotation.

However, over time the band “discovered unusual grace and the melody of the Belarusian language”, as it was admitted to the news agency «Минск-новости» in 2015 in shared memoirs about the experience of writing its first song in the native language “Studzień”. The path to demanded Belarusization was supported by the self-cover of “Gipsy” on the lyrics of Vital Voranau as well as “Ciańki”.

Discography 

 Next Level (single, 2004)
 Hover (single, 2005)
 Split Before, Together Now (split album, 2007)
 Gipsy (EP, 2007)
 Stand The Rain (single, 2008)
 In Tune (EP, 2008) 
 Happy for a While (single, 2010)
 HPS Remixed (EP, 2010)
 Rolz'n'Rulz (single, 2010)
Gentleman (album, 2012)
Garela Sasna (feat. Irena Kotvitskaya) (single, 2012)

Participation in collections 
Spotlight On (2005), track "Hover"
 = So Rock! Magazine 98 (2009), track "In Tune"
Tuzin. Perazagruzka (2009), track “Studzień”
Budzma The Best Rock / Budzma The Best Rock/New (2009), track “Ciańki”
«APS Sound» Volume 1 (2012), track “Rolz’n’Rulz”
The Festival Anthem by Waxme (2013), track “Stand the Rain (Waxme Space Funk Remix)”

Videography 
 "Hover" (2008)
 "Like A Whale" (2009)
 "In Tune" (2009)

Band members

Aleh Vial – lead and backing vocals, rhythm and lead guitars (1998–)
Konstantin Karman – lead and backing vocals, keyboards, synthesizer (2007–)
Maxim “Gandibober” Devichensky – bass guitar (1998–)
Alex Stepanovich – drums (2012–)

Former members
Alex Vashchilo – drums (1998–2002)
Artur Luchkov – drums (2003–2009)
Vadim Dubina – solo guitar (2003–2005)
Andrey Kozik – keyboards, backing vocals (2005–2006)
Vadim Isaev – solo guitar, backing vocals (2005–2008)
Alexey Kuznetsov – drums (2009)
Vladimir Agayan – drums (2010–2012)

Timeline

Literature

References

External links

Belarusian alternative rock groups
Belarusian indie rock groups
Musical groups established in 1998
Organizations based in Minsk
Musical quartets
Power pop groups
Art rock musical groups